Birlik is a neighborhood in the Lice District of Diyarbakır Province in Turkey.

References

Villages in Lice District